Schlatt may refer to:

Schlatt (Bad Krozingen), a village in Breisgau-Hochschwarzwald, Baden-Württemberg, Germany
Schlatt (landform), the Lower Saxon name for a heathland pond
Schlatt, Austria, a municipality in Vöcklabruck, Upper Austria, Austria
Schlatt, Thurgau, a municipality in Frauenfeld, Thurgau, Switzerland
Schlatt, Zurich, a municipality in Winterthur, Zürich, Switzerland
Schlatt-Haslen, a district of Appenzell Innerrhoden, Switzerland
Jschlatt, an American YouTuber and Twitch streamer